Hamble railway station is an unstaffed station near the village of Hamble-le-Rice, England. It is served by a 2-track electrified line which joins the Southampton to London main line, in the direction of Southampton at St Denys in Southampton, and joins the line running east from Eastleigh at Fareham.

Stopping services between Portsmouth and Southampton call at Hamble station approximately once per hour in each direction (including Sundays).

The station is adjacent to a bridge carrying Hamble Lane and also in close proximity to The Hamble School, the local secondary school. Bus stops serving the station are just to the north on Hamble Lane. Shelters are provided.

Just west of the station platforms is a disused but largely complete branch line running down into the Hamble-le-Rice oil terminal.

References

External links 

Railway stations in Hampshire
DfT Category F2 stations
Former Southern Railway (UK) stations
Railway stations in Great Britain opened in 1942
Railway stations served by South Western Railway
1942 establishments in England
Railway stations served by Govia Thameslink Railway